Fallaste corazón, is a Mexican telenovela produced by Televisa and originally transmitted by Telesistema Mexicano.

Cast 
Sonia Furió
Cuco Sánchez
Andrea Palma
Lupita Lara

References

External links 

Mexican telenovelas
Televisa telenovelas
Spanish-language telenovelas
1968 telenovelas
1968 Mexican television series debuts
1968 Mexican television series endings